Aleksandar Ješić (born 13 September 1994) is a Serbian football midfielder.

Club career
In December 2018, he joined Metalac GM.

References

External links
 
 Aleksandar Ješić Stats at utakmica.rs

1994 births
Living people
People from Gornji Milanovac
Association football midfielders
Serbian footballers
FK Borac Čačak players
OFK Beograd players
FK Voždovac players
FK Metalac Gornji Milanovac players
FK Mladost Lučani players
FK Neftchi Farg'ona players
Serbian First League players
Serbian SuperLiga players
Serbian expatriate footballers
Expatriate footballers in Uzbekistan
Serbian expatriate sportspeople in Uzbekistan